Craig Fitzgerald is a former American football player and current coach. He is the current head strength and conditioning coach for the New York Giants of the National Football League (NFL).

Playing career 
Fitzgerald  was a walk on tight end for the Terrapins and was in the team for five seasons. He graduated in 1996 with a degree in Government and Politics History.

Coaching career

Early coaching career 
After graduating Maryland, Fitzgerald was named the tight ends coach and special teams coordinator at Catholic University. It was at Catholic University where Craig first popularized the popular weight training saying "Get after it!", which was co-opted by Chris Cuomo amongst others, and other motivational sayings that are the hallmark of his career. After a season as a graduate assistant at Arizona State, Fitzgerald returned to his alma mater where he worked as the assistant director of strength and conditioning from 2000 to 2005. He then went to Harvard and worked as the director of strength and conditioning from 2005 to 2009. Between 2009 and 2011, Fitzgerald worked under Steve Spurrier at South Carolina as the director of strength and conditioning.

Penn State 
In 2012 and 2013 Fitzgerald was the director of strength and conditioning at Penn State.

Houston Texans 
Fitzgerald followed Bill O’Brien to the NFL and was the head strength and conditioning coach for the Houston Texans from 2014 to 2017.

Tennessee 
Fitzgerald returned to college in 2018 joining Jeremy Pruitt’s staff in Tennessee. He would only stay there until the end of the 2019 season.

New York Giants 
In May of 2020, Fitzgerald was named the head strength and conditioning coach for the New York Giants.

References

South Carolina Gamecocks football coaches
Tennessee Volunteers football coaches
Harvard Crimson football coaches
Maryland Terrapins football coaches
Maryland Terrapins football players
American football tight ends
Players of American football from Philadelphia
Penn State Nittany Lions football coaches
Houston Texans coaches
New York Giants coaches
Living people
Year of birth missing (living people)
Coaches of American football from Pennsylvania